Rieger–Kloss is a company specializing in the manufacturing of pipe organ. Its headquarters as well as the production facilities are located in Krnov, Czech Republic.

History 

Rieger–Kloss date their establishment to 1873, by the Rieger brothers; they claim a common history with Rieger Orgelbau up to the end of World War II. Following the war, the Czechoslovak government expelled the Ethnic German owners and workers of the original firm from Czechoslovakia, and nationalised the Rieger company. In 1948 they were merged with the workshop of Josef Kloss, which had also been nationalised, to form a new company called 'Rieger–Kloss'. The workers and owners of the original firm founded a new firm in Austria as 'Rieger Orgelbau'.

Rieger–Kloss met with success at the World Exhibition Expo 58, which led to 46 commissions in republics of the Soviet Union. The company became privately owned in 1994. Floods in July 1997 halted production for four weeks and caused great damage to property. They have built over 600 organs using pneumatic, electro-pneumatic and tracker action, and made a large number of restorations of historic instruments. They are now active in America and Asia. They build organs in the full range of sizes, from portative organs and compact instruments to large cathedral instruments, and employ about 70 people. They also make guitars and there is a company of the same name which makes pianos.

The Rieger–Kloss School of Organ Building 
Rieger–Kloss established a school of organ building in 1992. They take in twelve students from all over Europe each year, who pursue a four-year course of intensive study culminating in difficult written and practical exams. In order to graduate, each student must build a complete organ on their own. Subjects they cover include the English, German, French, and Czech languages, mathematics, organ playing, organ history, physics, mechanics, pipe and action building, acoustics, electrical engineering, technology, quality of materials, technical drawing, economics, and gymnastics.

Notable Rieger–Kloss organs 
 Slovak Philharmonic Society, Bratislava, 1956
 Belarusian State Philharmonic, Minsk, 1963
 Congress Hall, Prague, 1981
 St. Egyd, Klagenfurt, 1992
 Xinghai Concert Hall, Guangzhou, 1995
 Trinity Lutheran Church, Roselle, Illinois, 1996
 Concert Hall of the New Conservatory, Ostrava, 1996

Sources 
 Alfred Reichling: 'Rieger', Grove Music Online ed. L. Macy (Accessed 2007-07-01), http://www.grovemusic.com/
 Varhany Krnov, 1873–1973 (Krnov, 1973)
 Rieger–Kloss (Krnov, 1995)

External links 
 Official Rieger–Kloss website

Musical instrument manufacturing companies of the Czech Republic
Pipe organ building companies
Krnov
Manufacturing companies established in 1873
Manufacturing companies established in 1948
1948 establishments in Czechoslovakia
Czech brands
Manufacturing companies of Czechoslovakia